Spencer Trethewy (born 23 December 1971), known since 1998 as Spencer Day, is a asset fund manager and property developer, who is also currently manager of Farnborough F.C.

He first came to recognition as a teenager in 1989 when he saved Aldershot Football Club from closure with a £200,000 signed affidavit. However, he remained on the club's board as a director for only three months, and was voted off by the other directors after it transpired that he was in no position to be able to repay the money he had borrowed from other individuals in order to honour the affidavit in the agreed timeline.

Conviction
In 1994, Trethewy was convicted of breaching the Companies Act by running up bills when his airline company was suspended from trading and sentenced to twenty-five months in prison. This was reduced due to some successful appeals to eleven months.

Football management
In 2007 Trethewy, having changed his name to Spencer Day in 1998 taking his mother's maiden name became owner and manager of Combined Counties League club Chertsey Town. Since 2011 Day has been  manager of Farnborough. In 2013, the club entered administration, with debts of around two million pounds with Day being owed around £1m himself from loans to the club.

Business interests
Day is reported by The Non-League Paper to have built a substantial company finance investment business holding (managing partner of HH Finance) in the last fifteen years which specializes in residential and commercial holdings worldwide. HH own significant waterfront holdings in Kingston upon Thames according to the Land Registry. Day is known to own at least two superyachts, helicopters, and homes throughout the world. One of his main residences was featured in the Sunday Times "Beyond the brochure" article (1 November 2009) and is listed at £12m. Day was listed as a creditor of the Connaught Income series Fund and operation partner Tuita in 2012 which entered liquidation. Day took his claim to the Court of Appeal to reclaim losses of over £25m but failed to overturn the administrators set aside defence that led to his losses despite the High Court acknowledging fraud against Day. His losses included the 28,000 sq ft property in Ranmore Common he was building at the time of the liquidation.

Career

Managerial

References

https://www.thetimes.co.uk/article/beyond-the-brochure-the-okewood-hill-estate-surrey-lgg9xc6f2zd

http://www.bailii.org/ew/cases/EWCA/Civ/2014/1246.html

1971 births
Living people
English football chairmen and investors
English football managers
Farnborough F.C. managers
National League (English football) managers